Toshack is a surname. Notable people with the surname include:

Cameron Toshack (born 1970), Welsh footballer and coach
Ernie Toshack (1914–2003), Australian cricketer
John Toshack (born 1949), Welsh footballer and manager
Mat Toshack (born 1973), Australian rugby league footballer